A standard linear solid Q model (SLS) for attenuation and dispersion is one of many mathematical Q models that gives a definition of how the earth responds to seismic waves. When a plane wave propagates through a homogeneous viscoelastic medium, the effects of amplitude attenuation and velocity dispersion may be combined conveniently into a single dimensionless parameter, Q, the medium-quality factor.

Transmission losses may occur due to friction or fluid movement, and whatever the physical mechanism, they can be conveniently described with an empirical formulation where elastic moduli and propagation velocity are complex functions of frequency. Ursin and Toverud compared different Q models including the above model (SLS-model).

In order to compare the different models they considered plane-wave propagation in a homogeneous viscoelastic medium. They used the Kolsky-Futterman model as a reference and studied the SLS model. This model was compared with the Kolsky-Futterman model.

The Kolsky-Futterman model was first described in the article ‘Dispersive body waves’ by Futterman (1962).

Kolsky's attenuation-dispersion model

The Kolsky model assumes the attenuation α(w) to be strictly linear with frequency over the range of measurement:

And defines the phase velocity as:

SLS model

The standard linear solid model is developed from the stress-strain relation. Using a linear combination of springs and dashpots to represent elastic and viscous components, Ursin and Toverud used one relaxation time. The model was first developed by Zener. The attenuation is given by:

And defines the phase velocity as:

Computations
For each of the Q models, Ursin and Toverud computed the attenuation (1)(3) in the frequency band 0–300 Hz. Figure 1. presents the graph for the Kolsky model (blue) with two datasets (left and right) and same data – attenuation with cr=2000 m/s, Qr=100 and wr=2π100 Hz. 

The SLS model (green) has two different datasets, 

left c0=1990 m/s, Qc=100 and τr−1=2π100 

right c0=1985 m/s, Qc=84.71 and τr−1=6.75x100

Notes

References

Seismology measurement
Geophysics